Hesperoptenus is a genus of bats within the Vespertilionidae or vesper bat family.

The species within this genus are:

Blanford's bat (Hesperoptenus blanfordi)
False serotine bat (Hesperoptenus doriae)
Gaskell's false serotine (Hesperoptenus gaskelli)
Tickell's bat (Hesperoptenus tickelli)
Large false serotine (Hesperoptenus tomesi)

References

 
Bat genera
Taxa named by Wilhelm Peters